The 2015 Critérium International was the 84th edition of the Critérium International cycling stage race. It took place on the island of Corsica, around the city of Porto-Vecchio. Just like the previous three editions, the race consisted of three stages, two on the first race day (including a short individual time trial) and one on the second day.

Thibaut Pinot finished second in the general classification and won the young rider classification. 's rider Marco Canola claimed the mountains classification, while French team  won the teams classification.

Schedule

Teams
A total of 16 teams were selected to take part in the race:

Stages

Stage 1
28 March 2015 — Porto-Vecchio to Porto-Vecchio,

Stage 2
28 March 2015 — Porto-Vecchio to Porto-Vecchio, individual time trial (ITT)

Stage 3

Classification leadership table

References

External links

Criterium International
Criterium International
Critérium International